President of the Municipal Chamber is the title of the mayor in Portugal and other Portuguese-speaking countries.

Government occupations